Thomas Domingo (born 20 August 1985) is a French rugby union player. Domingo, who is a loosehead prop, plays his club rugby for ASM Clermont Auvergne. He made his debut for France against Wales on 27 February 2009.

Domingo's brother, Fabien Domingo, plays at number eight for CA Brive.

Domingo was named in France's provisional squad for the 2011 Rugby World Cup, but was ultimately left out of the final squad.

International tries

References

External links
 FFR profile 

1985 births
Living people
People from Tulle
French rugby union players
France international rugby union players
Rugby union props
ASM Clermont Auvergne players
French people of Spanish descent
Sportspeople from Corrèze